Antwerpse Basketball Club was a professional basketball club based in the city of Antwerp, Belgium.

History
Antwerpse founded in 1910 and became a very successful club in Belgian basketball mostly from the mid-'50s to the mid-'70s. In this time the club won eight titles of BLB. In 1972 the club changed its official name to Racing Basket Antwerpen. In the next season (1973–74) it adopted for sponsorship reasons the name Racing Ford Antwerpen, and then Racing Thorens Antwerpen. In 1975 the club merged with various Antwerp clubs such as Zaziko, Brabo, Tunnel and other teams which formed a new club with the name Sobabee. Finally in 1995 Sobabee merged with the other legendary club of Belgian basketball, Racing Mechelen, and created a new club based in Antwerp which now is known as Antwerp Giants.

Honours and achievements
Belgian League
 Champions (8): 1955–56, 1958–59, 1959–60, 1960–61, 1961–62, 1962–63, 1963–64, 1972–73
Belgian Cup
 Winners (3): 1960–61, 1971–72, 1973–74
 Runners-up (2): 1955–56, 1958–59

Defunct basketball teams in Belgium
Sport in Antwerp
Basketball teams established in 1910
Basketball teams disestablished in 1995